The Women's 1 m springboard competition of the 2020 European Aquatics Championships was held on 11 May 2021.

Results
The preliminary round was started at 12:30. The final was held at 20:20.

Green denotes finalists

References

Women's 1 m springboard